Mooley Avishar (also "Muli" and "Shmuel"; nicknamed "Moo"; שמואל אבישר; born May 13, 1947) is an Israeli former basketball player. He played the forward position. Avishar played in the Israeli Basketball Premier League, and for the Israeli national basketball team.

Biography

He has two daughters.

He attended Long Island University, after originally coming to the United States to attend Adelphi University. Avishar played for the LIU Brooklyn Blackbirds in 1970–71.

Avishar played in the Israeli Basketball Premier League. He competed for Hapoel Haifa, Maccabi Tel Aviv, Hapoel Tel Aviv, and Beitar Tel Aviv.

He played for the Israeli national basketball team. Avishar competed in the 1968 European Olympic Qualifying Tournament for Men, and in the 1972 Pre-Olympic Basketball Tournament.

References 

1947 births
Living people
Israeli men's basketball players
LIU Brooklyn Blackbirds men's basketball players
Sportspeople from Haifa
Hapoel Haifa B.C. players
Hapoel Tel Aviv B.C. players
Maccabi Tel Aviv B.C. players
Israeli Basketball Premier League players
Medalists at the 1974 Asian Games
Asian Games gold medalists for Israel
Asian Games medalists in basketball
Basketball players at the 1974 Asian Games